This is a list of episodes from the second season of Impractical Jokers.

Episodes

References

External links 
 Official website
 

Impractical Jokers
2012 American television seasons
2013 American television seasons